Postgaardia is a proposed basal clade of flagellate Euglenozoa, following Cavalier-Smith. As Euglenozoans may be basal Eukaryotes, the Postgaardia may be key to studying the evolution of Eukaryotes, including the incorporation of eukaryotic traits such as the incorporation of alphaproteobacterial mitochondrial endosymbionts.

Euglenozoa are a large group of flagellate Discoba. They include a variety of common free-living species, as well as a few important parasites, some of which infect humans. Euglenozoa are represented by three major clades, i.e., Kinetoplastea, Diplonema and Symbiontida.

Characteristics
Euglenozoa are characterized by the ultrastructure of the flagella.  In addition to the normal supporting microtubules or axoneme, each contains a rod (called paraxonemal), which has a tubular structure in one flagellum and a latticed structure in the other.  Based on this, two smaller groups are included: the diplonemids and Postgaardi.

Postgaardea is a third deep-branching euglenozoan clade that may be a sister to Euglenoida but does not branch within them or Glycomonada on the evolutionary most realistic sequence trees presented in the next three sections, contrary to some poorly resolved earlier trees. They were placed in the new subphylum Postgaardia because they are radically different ultrastructurally from both euglenoids and glycomonads.

Postgaardia are biciliate free-living anaerobes covered in epibiotic bacteria in longitudinal rows are the diagnosis. A highly contractile pellicle with multiple evenly spaced microtubules and no morphogenetic pairs that are specifically distinguished. Without cytostomal or reservoir encircling fibers, cemented jaw supports, or hard longitudinal straight cemented rods, the cytopharynx is simplified. Postgaardea is the lone included class in etymology.

Reconstructions of FA ultrastructure in Postgaardi and Calkinsia confirmed that they were fundamentally similar and deserved to be classified together as a distinct order Postgaardida and class Postgaardea , as both genera share six finger-like projections.

Taxonomy
Cavalier-Smith (2017)
 Infraphylum Postgaardia Cavalier-Smith 2016 stat. nov. Cavalier-Smith 2017
 Class Postgaardea Cavalier-Smith 1998 s.s. [Symbiontida Yubuki et al., 2009]
 Order Bihospitida Cavalier-Smith 2016
 Family Bihospitidae Cavalier-Smith 2016
 Order Postgaardida Cavalier-Smith 2003
 Family Calkinsiidae Cavalier-Smith 2016
 Family Postgaardidae Cavalier-Smith 2016

References

External links 
Tree of Life: Euglenozoa

Euglenozoa 
Bikont phyla
Taxa named by Thomas Cavalier-Smith